The black oystercatcher (Haematopus bachmani) is a conspicuous black bird found on the shoreline of western North America. It ranges from the Aleutian Islands of Alaska to the coast of the Baja California peninsula.

The black oystercatcher is the only representative of the oystercatcher family (Haematopodidae) over most of its range, overlapping slightly with the American oystercatcher (H. palliatus) on the coast of Baja California. Within its range it is most commonly referred to as the black oystercatcher, although this name is also used locally for the blackish oystercatcher and the African oystercatcher. Its scientific name is derived by John James Audubon from that of his friend John Bachman.

Although the species is not considered threatened, its global population size is estimated between 8,900–11,000 individuals.  The black oystercatcher is a species of high conservation concern throughout its range (U.S., Canadian, Alaskan, and Northern & Southern Pacific Shorebird Conservation Plans), a keystone indicator species along the north Pacific shoreline, a management indicator species in the Chugach National Forest, and a U.S. Fish & Wildlife Service focal species for priority conservation action.

Description 
The black oystercatcher is a large entirely black shorebird, with a long (9 cm) bright red bill and pink legs. It has a bright yellow iris and a red eye-ring. Its plumage varies slightly from north to south, being darker further north.

Behavior 
The black oystercatcher is restricted in its range, never straying far from shores, in particular favoring rocky shorelines. It has been suggested that this bird is seen mostly on coastal stretches which have some quieter embayments, such as jetty protected areas.  It forages in the intertidal zone, feeding on marine invertebrates, particularly molluscs such as mussels, limpets and chitons. It will also take crabs, isopods and barnacles. It hunts through the intertidal area, searching for food visually, often so close to the water's edge it has to fly up to avoid crashing surf. It uses its strong bill to dislodge food and pry shells open.

The black oystercatcher is a territorial bird during the nesting season, defending a foraging and nesting area in one territory. Some pairs have been recorded staying together for many years. Nests are small bowls or depressions close to the shore in which small pebbles and shell fragments are tossed in with a sideward or backward flick of the bill.

Around 2 to 3 eggs are laid in this nest, these are very hard and can even survive being submerged by a high tide or very high water levels. Incubation takes around 26–28 days. The chicks are capable of leaving the nest after one day, and will stay in the territory for a long time after fledging (40 days). The fledged juveniles will stay in the territory until the next breeding season. If the parents migrate, that year's chicks will migrate with them; this happens more often in the north of the range.

Gallery

See also 

Blackish oystercatcher

References 

Black Oystercatcher, The Birds of North America No 155 B. Andres & G. Falxa

External links 

American black oystercatcher videos on the Internet Bird Collection
"Black oystercatcher"-Haematopus bachmani photo gallery VIREO-(includes picture of egg clutch)
Black Oystercatcher Conservation Action Plan from U.S. Fish and Wildlife Service and Manomet Center for Conservation Sciences
Summary of Black Oystercatcher Conservation Plan in English and Spanish from Manomet Center for Conservation Sciences

Haematopus
Shorebirds
Native birds of Alaska
Native birds of the West Coast of the United States
Birds of Mexico
Birds described in 1838
Taxa named by John James Audubon
Taxobox binomials not recognized by IUCN